Mawak is a nearly extinct Papuan language of Madang Province, Papua New Guinea.

References

Tiboran languages
Languages of Madang Province
Endangered Papuan languages
Critically endangered languages